The Third Word (Spanish: "La tercera palabra") is a 1956 Mexican film based on the Argentinian play of the same name written by Alejandro Casona. It stars Sara García.

External links
 

1956 films
Mexican romantic comedy films
1950s Spanish-language films
1950s Mexican films
1956 romantic comedy films
Mexican black-and-white films